Sandia Heights is a census-designated place (CDP) in Bernalillo County, New Mexico, United States. The population was 10,293 at the 2010 census. It is part of the Albuquerque Metropolitan Statistical Area.

Geography
Sandia Heights is located in northern Bernalillo County at the western base of the Sandia Mountains. It is bordered to the south by the city of Albuquerque. The base station for the Sandia Peak Tramway is located just outside the northern edge of the CDP.

Climate 

Sandia Heights is categorized as being within the 7b USDA hardiness zone, meaning temperatures can get as low as 5 to 10 °F.

Demographics

Education
It is zoned to Albuquerque Public Schools.

References

Census-designated places in Bernalillo County, New Mexico
Census-designated places in New Mexico
Albuquerque metropolitan area